Round Barn, Washington Township may refer to:

Round Barn, Washington Township (Janesville, Iowa), listed on the National Register of Historic Places in Black Hawk County, Iowa
Round Barn, Washington Township (Sciola, Iowa), listed on the National Register of Historic Places in Montgomery County, Iowa